The Six-Day War was a series of armed confrontations between Ugandan and Rwandan forces around the city of Kisangani in the Democratic Republic of the Congo from 5 to 10 June 2000. The war formed part of the wider Second Congo War (1998–2003).

Kisangani was also a scene of violence between Rwandan and Ugandan troops in August 1999 and 5 May 2000. However, the conflicts of June 2000 were the most lethal and seriously damaged a large part of the city, with more than 6,600 rounds fired.

According to Justice et Libération, a human rights organisation based in Kisangani, the violence resulted in around 1,000 deaths and wounded at least 3,000, the majority of whom were civilians.

In culture 
The 2020 documentary film "Downstream to Kinshasa" by director Dieudo Hamadi centers on survivors of the Six-Day War, in which the victims travel to Kinshasa to seek compensation from the government.

References

External links
 Kisangani : Guerre de six jours : Amnésie collective, Alex Engwete, 8 June 2007, on laconscience.com. 
 Working for hope, December 2000, ACT International
 Heavy fighting resumes in Kisangani, 10 June 2000, BBC.
Some text has been based on the Downstream to Kinshasa article; see its history for attribution.
Second Congo War
Conflicts in 2000
Wars involving Uganda
Wars involving Rwanda
Six-day events
Kisangani
2000 in the Democratic Republic of the Congo